Tyrique is a masculine given name. Notable people with the name include:

Tyrique Bartlett (born 1999), South African footballer
Tyrique Jarrett (born 1994), American football nose tackle
Tyrique Jones (born 1997), American basketball player for Hapoel Tel Aviv in the Israeli Basketball Premier League
Tyrique Lake (born 1999), Anguillan footballer
Tyrique Stevenson (born 2000), American football player

Masculine given names